Maris (or Mariś) was an Etruscan god often depicted as an infant or child and given many epithets, including Mariś Halna, Mariś Husrnana ("Maris the Child"), and Mariś Isminthians. He was the son of Hercle, the Etruscan equivalent of Heracles. On two bronze mirrors, Maris appears in scenes depicting an immersion rite to ensure his immortality.

Some scholars think he influenced Roman conceptions of the god Mars, but this is not universally held.

References

Etruscan gods